The Centre de Formation de Mounana, also known as CF Mounana, is a Gabonese football club based in Mounana.

History
CF Mounana won the Gabonese national Championship for the first time in 2012.

Honours

National
Gabon Championnat National D1
Winners (3): 2011–12, 2015–16, 2016–17

Coupe du Gabon Interclubs
Winners (3): 2013, 2015, 2016

League and domestic cup history

Performance in CAF competitions

References

External links
Official website

Football clubs in Gabon
2006 establishments in Gabon
Association football clubs established in 2006